Gavin Christopher (May 1, 1949 – March 3, 2016) was an American R&B singer, songwriter, musician, and producer.

Early life and career
Born in Chicago, Illinois, he started out playing music at a very early age. Having been schooled by the likes of Oscar Brown Jr., Donny Hathaway, Baby Huey and later on Curtis Mayfield, he honed his writing and singing skills and began his career, first in a band called Lyfe (which also included Chaka Khan). Khan then left and joined Rufus (scoring several pop and R&B hits with them). Christopher later joined another band called High Voltage with future Rufus members Bobby Watson (bassist) and Tony Maiden, as well as Lalomie Washburn, who later wrote several Rufus songs. Christopher himself would also become associated with Rufus, as he penned the song "Once You Get Started", which was later recorded by the band and hit #10 on the Billboard Hot 100 in 1975. He also wrote three songs on Rufus' next album, Rufus featuring Chaka Khan: "Dance Wit Me" (another big hit), "Fool's Paradise," and "Have A Good Time."

Christopher relocated to Los Angeles, California, where he was signed to his first recording contract with Island Records. He later moved back to Chicago to record and work with Curtis Mayfield on the Curtom/RSO record label. He worked with Herbie Hancock, writing and singing on several of his albums. Christopher also penned the Hancock song, "Stars in Your Eyes".

Following a move to New York City, Christopher signed with EMI Manhattan Records and scored his biggest single, "One Step Closer to You" (his only Hot 100 hit as an artist, #22 in 1986) and another major R&B hit two years later with "You Are Who You Love." He also produced music for artists such as Grandmaster Flash, Afrika Bambaataa and The Ritchie Family, as well as mentored and worked with a young Mariah Carey prior to her getting her big break. He was heavily involved in the early hip-hop scene, writing such hits as "Girls Love the Way He Spins", "Sign of the Time", "We Gonna Rock America" and "All Night All Right".

Gavin's sister is dance music vocalist Shawn Christopher.

Gavin Christopher died on March 3, 2016, in Chicago of congestive heart failure at the age of 66. He is survived by his daughter Chloe Zae Jackson.

Solo discography

Albums
 1976: Gavin Christopher [1976]
 1979: Gavin Christopher [1979]
 1986: One Step Closer
 1987: Gavin

Singles

 1976: "Good Stuff"
 1976: "Love Has a Face of Its Own"
 1979: "Feelin' the Love" (U.S. R&B #77)
 1985: "Best Part of the Night" (Jeff Lorber feat. Gavin Christopher)
 1986: "One Step Closer to You" (U.S. #22, U.S. R&B #25, U.S. Dance #9, U.K. #99)
 1986: "Back in Your Arms"
 1988: "You Are Who You Love" (U.S. R&B #10)
 1988: "Can't Put Out the Fire"

Miscellaneous appearances

The following is a partial listing of recordings Christopher appears on and produced
 1979: Gavin Christopher Gavin Christopher - Percussion, Piano, Conga, Vocals, Clavinet, Producer
 1979: Gonna Getcha Love Charles Jackson - producer' Keyboards, Vocals
 1980: Monster Herbie Hancock - Vocals
 1981: Magic Windows Herbie Hancock - Vocals, Bass Arrangement
 1982: Paradise Leroy Hutson - Background Vocals
 1985: They Said It Couldn't Be Done Grandmaster Flash - producer, Synthesizer, Bass, Percussion, Keyboards, Programming, producer, Horn Arrangements, String Arrangements, Drum Programming, Mixing, Synthesizer Bass, Simmons Drums, System Programming
 1986: Beware (The Funk Is Everywhere) Afrika Bambaataa - Producer
 1987: Gavin Gavin Christopher Mic MurphyDavid Frank - Keyboards, Vocals producers
 1990: Brilliant! Kym Mazelle - Vocal Arrangement
 1992: "Don't Lose the Magic" (Shawn Christopher) - producer, songwriter
 1993: Club Classics 1982–1984, Vol. 1 Various Artists - producer, Arranger, producer, Mixing
 1993: Soul Mission Soul Mission - Vocals
 1995: Best Disco in Town: The Best of the Ritchie Family The Ritchie Family - Producer
 1996: Adventures of Grandmaster Flash, Melle Mel & the Furi Grandmaster Flash & the Furious Five/Mel - Producer
 1997: Too Much Woman Brigette McWilliams - Background Vocals
 1997: Whatever Happened to the Blues Phil Upchurch - Vocals
 2000: Best of Herbie Hancock: The Hits Herbie Hancock - Arranger, Vocals
 2001: Breakin' Arthur Baker - Piano, Vocals
 2001: Mr. Funk Herbie Hancock - Chant
 2002 Bullet Proof Bruce Conte - Vocals
 2002: Evolution Will Not Be Televised Aquabox - Vocals, Background Vocals, Produce
 2002: Herbie Hancock Box Herbie Hancock - Vocals
 2004: D'Soca Zone 5th Spin Various Artists - Producer
 2006: Chicago LP Chicago's Finest - Background Vocals producer
 2006: Definitive Groove Collection Grandmaster Flash Producer, Original Recording - Producer
 2006: Everyday People Project Steve Harvey - Background Vocals
 2006: Fresh and Furious: Hip Hop's Beginning Grandmaster Flash & The Furious Five - Synthesizer, Bass, Percussion, Keyboards, Programming, Tom-Toms, Gavin Christopher Producer, Horn Arrangements, String Arrangements, Mixing]
 2007: Daily News [Circuit City Exclusive] Donnie - Background Vocals
 2007: Daily News Donnie - Background Vocals [Gavin Christopher [Island] Gavin Christopher ] Guitar, Piano, Conga, Keyboards, Vocals, Background Vocals, Clavinet, producer
 Heat for the Feets Lee Garrett - Background Vocals
 One Step Closer Gavin Christopher - Synthesizer, Keyboards, Background Vocals, producer
 Way Ian Martin - Vocals

A partial list of albums Gavin Christopher's songs appear on:
 Aquabox – Evolution Will Not Be Televised
 Loletta Holloway – "Crash Goes Love" (1987)
 Beatstreet – "Breakdance"/vocals (1987)
 Average White Band – Feel No Fret
 Candy Dulfer – For the Love of You
 Kenny Dope – Strange Games and Funky Things, Vol. 3
 Grandmaster Flash – They said it couldn't be done
 Adventures of Grandmaster Flash, Melle Mel Shango funk theology
 Africa Bambatta
 Herbie Hancock – Best of Herbie Hancock: The Hits Herbie Hancock Monster
 Chaka Khan – Life Is a Dance (The Remix Project)
 Manila Thriller – Please
 Brigette McWilliams - Too Much Woman
 Rufus – Rufusized
 Rufus & Chaka Khan – Rufus Featuring Chaka Khan
 Rufus & Chaka Khan – Stompin' at the Savoy (Live)
 Original Soundtrack Prefontaine

References

External links
MySpace Page

1949 births
2016 deaths
American keyboardists
Record producers from Illinois
20th-century African-American male singers
Singers from Chicago
Island Records artists
RSO Records artists
African-American male singer-songwriters
21st-century African-American male singers
Singer-songwriters from Illinois